Carlos Ortiz (born 24 April 1991) is a Mexican professional golfer who has played on the PGA Tour and Web.com Tour. He won the 2020 Vivint Houston Open on the PGA Tour.

Early life
Ortiz was born in Guadalajara, Jalisco, Mexico. He played college golf in the United States at the University of North Texas. At the 2011 Summer Universiade, he was on the team that won the bronze medal. He played in the Mexican team at the 2010 Eisenhower Trophy and again in 2012 where Mexico were runners-up.

His younger brother Álvaro is a professional golfer who represented Mexico in the Eisenhower Trophy in 2014, 2016 and 2018 and won the 2019 Latin America Amateur Championship.

Professional career
Ortiz turned professional in 2013. He finished T-15 at the Web.com Tour qualifying school after playing in the first, second and final stages. He then joined the Tour in 2014. He won the fourth event of the year, the Panama Claro Championship. He won his second Web.com Tour event three weeks later at the El Bosque Mexico Championship and moved inside the top 200 in the Official World Golf Ranking. Ortiz was given a sponsor exemption to compete in the 2014 Memorial Tournament, where he finished T-65 in his PGA Tour debut. He won his third Web.com event of the season at the WinCo Foods Portland Open, earning fully exempt status on the 2014−15 PGA Tour as a three-time, single-season winner. He was later voted the Web.com Tour Player of the Year.

In his first full PGA Tour season, Ortiz finished 93rd in the FedEx Cup and had a season-best finish of T9 at the OHL Classic at Mayakoba. However he lost his place on the tour after a poor 2016 season. He played on the Web.com Tour in 2017 and 2018 and regained his place on the PGA Tour after the 2018 season. He finished the 2018–19 PGA Tour season 113th in the FedEx Cup Playoffs with a best finish of tied for third place in the Sanderson Farms Championship, played in late 2018.

In November 2020, Ortiz won his first PGA Tour event at the Vivint Houston Open. He became the third Mexican winner on the PGA Tour after Victor Regalado and Cesar Sanudo. The last PGA Tour victory by a Mexican born player, before Ortiz' win, was 22 years earlier by Regalado at the 1978 Quad Cities Open. The win by Ortiz qualified him for the 2021 Masters Tournament.

Professional wins (6)

PGA Tour wins (1)

Web.com Tour wins (3)

Gira de Golf Profesional Mexicana wins (2)

Playoff record
LIV Golf League playoff record (0–1)

Results in major championships
Results not in chronological order in 2020.

CUT = missed the half-way cut
"T" indicates a tie for a place
NT = No tournament due to COVID-19 pandemic

Results in The Players Championship

CUT = missed the halfway cut
C = Cancelled after the first round due to the COVID-19 pandemic

Results in World Golf Championships

1Cancelled due to COVID-19 pandemic

NT = No tournament
"T" = Tied

Team appearances
Amateur
Eisenhower Trophy (representing Mexico): 2010, 2012

See also
2014 Web.com Tour Finals graduates
2018 Web.com Tour Finals graduates

References

External links

Mexican male golfers
PGA Tour golfers
LIV Golf players
Olympic golfers of Mexico
Golfers at the 2020 Summer Olympics
Korn Ferry Tour graduates
North Texas Mean Green men's golfers
Universiade medalists in golf
Universiade bronze medalists for Mexico
Medalists at the 2011 Summer Universiade
Sportspeople from Guadalajara, Jalisco
1991 births
Living people
21st-century Mexican people